The discography of Enya, an Irish singer-songwriter, consists of eight studio albums, three compilation albums, twenty-one singles and a number of other appearances. Enya achieved a breakthrough in her career in 1988 with the album Watermark, containing the hit song "Orinoco Flow" which topped the charts in the United Kingdom and reached number 2 in Germany. Three years later, the similarly successful Shepherd Moons followed, which featured singles "Caribbean Blue" and "Book of Days". In 1992, a re-mastered version of the 1987 Enya album was released as The Celts. Four years after Shepherd Moons, she released The Memory of Trees (1995), another top five success in both the UK and Germany, as well as her first top 10 album in the United States. Singles released from the album were "Anywhere Is" and "On My Way Home". In 1997, Enya released her greatest hits collection, Paint the Sky with Stars: The Best of Enya, again a top five album in the UK and Germany, which featured two new songs: "Paint the Sky with Stars" and "Only If...". Following a five-year break, Enya released the album A Day Without Rain in 2000. The album is Enya's most successful to date, peaking at No. 2 on the US Billboard 200 albums chart. The first single, "Only Time", was used in the film Sweet November and peaked at No. 10 on the US Hot 100 and number 1 in Germany.

In 2001, Enya recorded "May It Be", which featured in the first installment of The Lord of the Rings film series, The Fellowship of the Ring, and was her second consecutive single to enter the German charts at number 1. In November 2005, a new album, entitled Amarantine, was released. It reached the Top 10 in both the UK and the US, and peaked at number 3 in Germany. In 2006, Enya released several Christmas-themed CDs with newly recorded material. On 10 October 2006, Sounds of the Season with Enya, containing six songs, was released only in the United States. In November 2008, And Winter Came... was released - the Christmas- and Winter-themed album was another sizable hit, reaching the top 10 in many countries, an unusual accomplishment for a seasonal album. The following year, Enya released her second compilation, The Very Best of Enya in November 2009 and took an extended break from writing and recording. In 2012, she returned to the studio to record Dark Sky Island, and it was released in November 2015. The album received a mostly positive reception from critics and was a commercial success upon release, within the top ten in sixteen countries worldwide. She has sold over 26.5 million albums in the United States alone according to Nielsen Soundscan, making her one of the best-selling artists in the country. She has won four Grammy Awards and placed five consecutive albums at top ten on the US Billboard 200.

Ever since 1994 according to Official Charts Company Enya has sold 3 million units in UK, and according to Nielsen Enya has 25,2 million US sales since 1991.

Enya has achieved worldwide record sales of more than 80 million, making her one of the best-selling music artists of all time.

Albums

Studio albums

Compilation albums

Soundtrack albums

Box sets

Video albums

Extended plays

Studio

Compilation

Singles

As lead artist

As featured artist

Promotional singles

Other charted songs

Music videos

Official videos

Lyric videos

References

External links
 Enya discography albums songs covers lyrics
 The Enya Discography
 Enya Lyrics site
 Northern Skyline – Enya, Clannad & Moya Brennan News blog
 Enya Non-Album Tracks – detailed guide to Enya b-sides

Discography
Discographies of Irish artists
Pop music discographies